An Yin (born 1959) is a Chinese-American Earth scientist and a Professor of Geology at the University of California, Los Angeles (UCLA). His early work explores the mechanical origin and kinematic evolution of low-angle normal faults and thrust systems in the North American Cordillera. He is perhaps best known for his work on the tectonic evolution of the Himalayas and Tibetan plateau. His research interests have shifted in recent years to slow-earthquake mechanics, early Earth tectonics, and planetary studies.

Early life 
Yin was born in the city of Harbin, northeastern China. His parents were medical school professors and were sent to countryside during the Cultural Revolution from 1966 to 1976 in China. Yin was spending part of his early life living in a small village with his parents during this time. His experience during the Cultural Revolution has profoundly shaped his later life.

Education 
Despite the lack of systematic education in elementary, middle and high schools resulting from numerous disruptions in life during the Cultural Revolution, Yin managed to pass the nationwide university examination in China and entered the Peking University in 1978. He graduated in 1982 with a B.S. degree in Geomechanics and stayed on for one year in a MS program studying Precambrian geology of northern China under the supervision of Professor Xianglin Qian at the Peking University. He came to the United States in 1983 without finishing his MS degree in China. From 1983 to 1987, Yin pursued his Ph.D. degree in geology at the University of Southern California (USC) under the supervision of Professor Gregory A. Davis.

Career 
In 1987, Yin was offered a tenure track Acting Assistant Professor position at UCLA, one year before he officially obtained his doctoral degree from USC. At UCLA, he was appointed as an Assistant Professor in 1988, promoted to an Associate Professor in 1993, and has been a Full Professor since 1996 .

Research 
Yin's research has been focused on studying how mountains were created and destroyed on Earth and other solar-system bodies. His work on Earth is field-based, which starts with making detailed geologic maps and ends with construction of kinematic and mechanical models for the evolution of Earth's lithosphere. 
Based on analysis of satellite images and comparison against similar geologic settings from the Earth such as the western Pacific subduction system, Yin proposed a hypothesis that a primitive form of plate tectonics, expressed as local plate boundary processes involving thermal-boundary-layer recycling by impact-induced slab rollback, may have been responsible for the formation of the Tharsis rise on Mars. His proposed primitive plate tectonics differs from the modern plate tectonics on Earth, which operates over the entire planet

Honors and community service
In 1994, Yin was awarded the Donath Medal  from the Geological Society of America (GSA). He became a fellow of the American Geophysical Union in 2013, and has been a GSA Fellow since 1994.

Yin is the 2022 recipient of the Penrose Medal from the Geological Society of America.

Yin was an Editor-in-Chief  for Tectonophysics and  Earth and Planetary Science Letters.

Notable students 
Jessica Watkins, an astronaut selected in the NASA class of 2017, was one of his former Ph.D. students

Paul A. Kapp, a Professor of Geology at the University of Arizona and a former PhD student of Yin, was the 2008 recipient of the Donath Medal from the Geological Society of America

Personal life 
In 1992, Yin met Sandy, a Chinese American who was born in Hong Kong. They were married in 1997 and have two children.

Selected bibliography 

 Yin A, Harrison TM. Geologic evolution of the Himalayan-Tibetan orogen. Annual review of earth and planetary sciences. 2000 May;28(1):211-80.[2]
 Harrison TM, Copeland P, Kidd WS, Yin AN. Raising tibet. Science. 1992 Mar 27;255(5052):1663-70. [3]
 Yin A. Cenozoic tectonic evolution of the Himalayan orogen as constrained by along-strike variation of structural geometry, exhumation history, and foreland sedimentation. Earth-Science Reviews. 2006 May 1;76(1-2):1-31.[4]
 Yin A, Nie S. An indentation model for the North and South China collision and the development of the Tan‐Lu and Honam fault systems, eastern Asia. Tectonics. 1993 Aug;12(4):801-13. [5]
 Yin A, Rumelhart PE, Butler R, Cowgill E, Harrison TM, Foster DA, Ingersoll RV, Qing Z, Xian-Qiang Z, Xiao-Feng W, Hanson A. Tectonic history of the Altyn Tagh fault system in northern Tibet inferred from Cenozoic sedimentation. Geological Society of America Bulletin. 2002 Oct 1;114(10):1257-95. [6]
 Yin A. Cenozoic tectonic evolution of Asia: A preliminary synthesis. Tectonophysics. 2010 Jun 5;488(1-4):293-325. [7]
 Kapp P, Yin A, Harrison TM, Ding L. Cretaceous-Tertiary shortening, basin development, and volcanism in central Tibet. Geological Society of America Bulletin. 2005 Jul 1;117(7-8):865-78. 
 Murphy MA, Yin A, Harrison TM, Durr SB, Ryerson FJ, Kidd WS. Did the Indo-Asian collision alone create the Tibetan plateau?. Geology. 1997 Aug 1;25(8):719-22.

References

External links 
 An Yin's Website
 Curriculum Vitae
 Discovery Channel | Weather Rampage - "Earthquakes Shakes Up Pandas" (2008)
 PBS | NOVA - "Secrets of the Forbidden City" (2017)

1959 births
Living people
Chinese emigrants to the United States
American geologists
Penrose Medal winners
Scientists from Harbin